Frederick "Freddie" Falcon is the official mascot of the NFL's Atlanta Falcons.  He was Atlanta, Georgia's first mascot and has entertained fans for more than 35 years.

He is not to be confused with the namesake mascot of Bowling Green State University or that of the Fresno state, of the ECHL's Fresno Falcons.

External links
Brief Information About Freddie Falcon at AtlantaFalcons.com.

Atlanta Falcons
Bird mascots
National Football League mascots
Fictional birds of prey
Mascots introduced in 1972
Male characters in advertising